The Champion Pub is a pinball game released by Williams Electronics Games (under the Bally label) in 1998. The theme of the game revolves around boxing in a 1920s pub.

Description
The playfield of The Champion Pub features several toys which include:

 A jump rope area, in which the player must jump the ball over a rotating metal bar using a flipper-controlled solenoid
 A speed bag area, where the player must knock the ball against a target with a pair of plastic fists controlled by the flippers
 A rotating wall with a heavy bag on one side and a boxer figure on the other, which the player can hit with the ball to train for a fight or land punches against an opponent, respectively

Game features include four multiball modes and 15 jackpot levels, 10 different international opponents, and over 300 speech sound effects.

Gameplay
The primary goal is to build up a health bar by making indicated shots, then begin a fight against one of the pub's 10 resident opponents and hit the boxer figure enough times to completely drain his health.

Multiball modes
The multiballs are as follows:

 Multi-Brawl: A three-ball mode, started by locking three balls. Each lit shot made awards the current jackpot and advances it by one level. Jackpots can also be collected by making lit shots outside of this mode.
 Raid Multiball: A three-ball mode, started by winning three fights. All targets are worth a set value, which increases with every hit up to a maximum.
 Fisticuffs Multiball: A two-ball mode, started by hitting the heavy bag enough times to spell BAR FLY FISTICUFFS. The wall rotates to expose the boxer, who can be hit in the head or stomach for points.
 Champion Multiball: A four-ball mode, started by winning five fights; consists of all three modes above at once, with a bonus for making lit shots.

Certain groups of multiballs can run simultaneously, for which four balls are put into play.

Wizard mode: The Ultimate Challenge
The wizard mode of the game is the Ultimate Challenge, with the following requirements:

 Play Multi-Brawl, Raid Multiball, and Fisticuffs Multiball
 Collect all 15 jackpots
 Complete all three training exercises (speed bag, heavy bag, jump rope)
 Become the Pub Champion by winning five fights
 Win at least one fight by knockout

Once the Ultimate Challenge begins, four balls are put into play and the player is given one full health bar with which to defeat the five fighters not defeated to become Pub Champion. Successfully doing so lights additional shots for bonus points.

After the player's fifth victory, all fights outside of the Ultimate Challenge are played as "Cash Fights," in which the player must wager a portion of their score. The wager is added for a victory or deducted for a loss.

Game quotes
 "Welcome to Champion Pub, kid!"
 "I'm your coach kid so ya better listen up!"
 "I'm O'Brien, and these are me knuckles!"

Cast of Characters
 The Kid, the character assumed by the player
 Sir Winston Pounds, from England
 Master Bim Bam Boom, from China
 Knuckles O'Brien, from Ireland
 Franz von Pain, from Germany
 Pierre LePunche, from France
 Patrotsky Yirbitov, from Russia
 Antonio Jaberini, from Italy
 Steveo, from San Francisco (USA)
 Armando Santiago, from Spain
 Dan Unda, from Australia
 The Drunk
 Crazy Bob
 The Coach
 The Pub Owner

Credits
 Champion Pub Design Team: Pete Piotrowski, Dwight Sullivan, Brad Cornell, Rich Carle, Paul Barker, Linda Doane, Adam Rhine
 Voices: Vince Pontarelli as Sir Winston Pounds, Jon Hey as The Master, Scott Stevenson as Knuckles O'Brien, Scott Stevenson as Franz von Pain, Jon Hey as Pierre LePunche, Herman Sanchez as Patrotsky Yirbitov, Rich Carle as Antonio Jaberini, Vince Pontarelli as Steveo, Herman Sanchez as Armando Santiago, Rich Carle as Dan Unda, Scott Stevenson as The Drunk, Jon Hey as Crazy Bob, Greg Freres as The Coach, Rob Berry as the Pub Owner
 Copy Consultant: Scott Adsit
 Special Thanks to: Kevin O'Connor, Margaret Hudson, Pat McMahon, Andy Eloff, Inger Carle, Graham West, Loren Stanton, Howard Thomas, Ben Rodriguez, Butch Ortega, Chuck Bleich, Brian Magruder, Kent Pemberton, Jose Delgado, Jim Shird, Wally Roeder, Mark Johnson, Ted Chmiola, Mike Laporta, Dwen Larson, Hernando Azarcon, Mike Mendes, Al Cardenas, Dale Prasse, Bill Thomson, Phil Kohler, Jerry Bartel, Edwin Toliver, Linda Williams, Loriene Livingston, Fred Flores, Joe Pratt, Juan Abrams, John McCaffer, Elaine Johnson, Karen Trybula
 Extra Special Thanks to: Sue Piotrowski, Anna Sullivan, Liz Cornell, Inger Carle, Traci Barker, Dave Doane, Karen Rhine

Digital versions
The Champion Pub is available as a licensed table of Pinball FX 3 for several platforms. It was formerly available for The Pinball Arcade until license expiration.

References

External links
IPDB listing for The Champion Pub
Background of Boxing Pubs

1998 pinball machines
Midway pinball machines
Bally pinball machines